Pindiki Bhubalendra (Odia: ପିଣ୍ଡିକି ବାହୁବଳେନ୍ଦ୍ର) was the Dalei (Khandayat  local commander) of Daruthenga village of Khordha district in the Indian state of Odisha. He actively participated in the Paika Rebellion. The British excluded him from the amnesty provision. Instead he was treated as a high profile threat to the British authorities. He was shot dead at the age of 50 while trying to avoid a third episode of British captivity.

Paika Rebellion 
As a Commander, Pindiki was involved actively in the Great Rebellion of 1817–18 against the British. He was labeled a criminal and robber for his rebellious activities, and was charged and incarcerated for life. Pindiki escaped from imprisonment and rejoined the rebel ranks. Pindiki and his other associates Krushna Chandra Bhramorbar Ray and Gopal Chhotrai, evaded capture when the initial phase of the rebellion was brought under control. In December 1817, the rebels regrouped and looted the British and continued to instigate rebellious thoughts among the common people. A reward of rupees 1000 was declared for apprehending him along with other movement leaders.

He was betrayed by his trusted childhood friend Dhruva Harichandan of Malipada who drugged him during dinner at his home, allowing the British to capture him while he was unconscious. He was taken to Barabati fort for imprisonment but escaped again by swimming across the Kathajodi river and reached Baranga.

At Baranga, Pindiki was shot dead while trying to escape British custody for the third and penultimate time. Ray and Chhotrai were sentenced to death by hanging.

References 

1768 births
1818 deaths
People from Khordha district
Military personnel from Odisha
Indian warriors
Indian revolutionaries
Executed Indian people
19th-century Indian people
19th-century executions by British India